A military town is a civilian municipality which is economically dependent upon or receives its greatest economic impetus from a nearby military installation, such as a military base or military academy.

Some military establishments operate in closed cities, where permission is required to enter.

Examples

Canada
 Trenton, Ontario (associated with CFB Trenton)
 Kingston, Ontario (associated with CFB Kingston and the Royal Military College of Canada)
 Petawawa, Ontario (associated with CFB Petawawa)
 Borden, Ontario (associated with CFB Borden)

Pakistan
 Abbottabad (associated with Pakistan Military Academy)
 Rawalpindi (associated with General Headquarters)

Saudi Arabia
 Khamis Mushait (associated with Khamis Mushait Army Base and King Khalid Air Base)
 Hafar al-Batin (associated with Hafr al-Batin Air Force Base and King Khalid Military City)
 Tabuk (associated with King Faisal Air Base, Tabuk Army Base and the Royal Saudi Air Force Hawk training squadrons)
 Al Kharj (associated with Prince Sultan Air Base and General Corporation for Military Industries

United Kingdom
 Aldershot (associated with the Aldershot Garrison)
 Brecon (associated with Derring Lines and The Barracks)
Catterick Garrison (largest British Army garrison in the world)

United States
 Abilene, Texas (associated with Dyess Air Force Base)
 Alamogordo, New Mexico (associated with Holloman Air Force Base)
 Biloxi, Mississippi (associated with Keesler Air Force Base) 
 Bremerton, Washington (associated with Puget Sound Naval Shipyard and Naval Submarine Base Bangor)
 Clovis, New Mexico (dependent upon with Cannon Air Force Base)
 Colorado Springs, Colorado (associated with Fort Carson, Peterson Space Force Base, Schriever Space Force Base, and the Air Force Academy)
 Columbus, Georgia (dependent upon Fort Benning)
 Columbus, Mississippi (dependent upon Columbus Air Force Base)
 Dayton, Ohio (dependent upon Wright-Patterson Air Force Base)
 Fairbanks, Alaska (Fort Wainwright, Eielson Air Force Base, Fort Greely and Clear Air Force Station)
 Fayetteville, North Carolina (associated with Fort Bragg and Pope Army Air Field)
 Fort Walton Beach, Florida (associated with Eglin Air Force Base) 
 Havelock, North Carolina (associated with MCAS Cherry Point)
 Hinesville, Georgia (dependent upon Fort Stewart)
 Hopkinsville, Kentucky (associated with Fort Campbell)
 Jacksonville, Florida (associated with NAS Jacksonville and Naval Station Mayport; also within proximity of Naval Submarine Base Kings Bay)
 Jacksonville, North Carolina (associated with Camp Lejeune)
 Junction City, Kansas (associated with Ft. Riley)
 Killeen, Texas (associated with Fort Hood)
 Knob Noster, Missouri (dependent upon with Whiteman Air Force Base)
 Leavenworth, Kansas (associated with Fort Leavenworth)
 Lompoc, California (associated with Vandenberg Space Force Base)
 Minot, North Dakota (dependent upon with Minot Air Force Base) 
 Norfolk, Virginia (associated with Naval Station Norfolk)
 Oceanside, California (associated with Marine Corps Base Camp Pendleton)
 San Antonio, Texas (associated with Joint Base San Antonio)
 San Diego, California (associated with Naval Base San Diego, Marine Corps Air Station Miramar, Marine Corps Recruit Depot San Diego, Naval Base Point Loma, Bob Wilson Naval Hospital, the Space and Naval Warfare Systems Center San Diego, Space and Naval Warfare Systems Command, and Coast Guard Air Station San Diego)
 Sierra Vista, Arizona (dependent upon with Fort Huachuca). 
 St. Robert, Missouri (dependent upon with Fort Leonard Wood)
 Tacoma, Washington (associated with Joint Base Lewis–McChord)
 Tucson, Arizona (associated with Davis–Monthan Air Force Base)
 Warner Robins, Georgia (dependent upon Robins Air Force Base)
 Wichita Falls, Texas (dependent upon Sheppard Air Force Base)
 Westworth Village, Texas (Naval Air Station Joint Reserve Base Fort Worth)

See also
 College town
 Coast Guard City
 Cantonments (such as Delhi Cantonment)
 Closed city (such as Zheleznogorsk, Krasnoyarsk Krai)
 Garrison town (such as Aldershot Garrison)

Former
 Seaside, California (associated with Fort Ord until 1994)

Military life
Military installations
Cities by type